Bo Barrett (born James P. Barrett) is the current winemaker of Chateau Montelena. He is the son of Jim Barrett, under whose ownership the 1973 vintage Chardonnay won first place among white wines at the 1976 Judgment of Paris wine tasting.  Barrett was an assistant during that vintage, working under the tutelage of Mike Grgich. He is married to Heidi Barrett, former wine maker at Screaming Eagle Winery and Vineyards.

In the film Bottle Shock, a fictionalized account of the Judgment of Paris wine tasting, Bo Barrett was portrayed by actor Chris Pine.

Notes

References

American winemakers
American viticulturists
Living people
Year of birth missing (living people)
Wine merchants
People from Napa County, California